Sinovac Biotech Ltd. is a Chinese biopharmaceutical company based in Haidian District, Beijing that focuses on the research, development, manufacture, and commercialization of vaccines that protect against human infectious diseases. The company was listed on the Nasdaq but the exchange halted Sinovac's trading in February 2019 due to a proxy fight. The company has faced bribery probes in China.

Vaccines
Sinovac's commercialized vaccines include CoronaVac (COVID-19 vaccine), Inlive (Enterovirus 71 vaccine), Anflu (influenza vaccine), Healive (hepatitis A vaccine), varicella vaccine and mumps vaccine.

COVID-19 vaccine development

CoronaVac is an inactivated virus COVID-19 vaccine developed by Sinovac. It has been in Phase III clinical trials in Brazil, Chile, Indonesia,  Philippines, and Turkey.

It relies on traditional technology similar to the Sinopharm BIBP vaccine and Covaxin, otherwise known as inactivated-virus COVID-19 vaccines in Phase III trials. CoronaVac does not need to be frozen, and both the vaccine and raw material for formulating the new doses could be transported and refrigerated at 2–8 °C (36–46 °F), temperatures at which flu vaccines are kept.

A real-world study of ten millions of Chileans who received CoronaVac found it 66% effective against symptomatic COVID-19, 88% against hospitalization, 90% against ICU admissions, and 86% against deaths. In Brazil, after 75% of the population in Serrana, São Paulo received CoronaVac, preliminary results show deaths fell by 95%, hospitalizations by 86%, and symptomatic cases by 80%. In Indonesia, real world data from 128,290 healthcare workers showed 94% protection against symptomatic infection by the vaccine, beating results in clinical trials.

Phase III results from Turkey published in The Lancet showed an efficacy of 84% based on 10,218 participants in the trials. Phase III results from Brazil previously showed 50.7% efficacy at preventing symptomatic infections and 83.7% effective in preventing mild cases needing treatment. Efficacy against symptomatic infections increased to 62.3% with an interval of 21 days or more between the doses.

CoronaVac is being used in vaccination campaigns in various countries in Asia, South America, North America, and Europe. By April 2021, Sinovac had a production capacity of two billion doses a year and had delivered 600 million total doses. It is currently being manufactured at several facilities in China, Brazil, and Egypt. On 1 June 2021, the World Health Organization (WHO) validated the vaccine for emergency use. Sinovac has signed purchase agreements for 380 million doses from COVAX.

See also
 CanSino Biologics
 Sinopharm

References

External links
 

Pharmaceutical companies of China
Manufacturing companies based in Beijing
Biotechnology companies of China
Biopharmaceutical companies
Chinese companies established in 1999
Chinese brands
Biotechnology companies established in 1999
Companies listed on the Nasdaq
Medical research
COVID-19 vaccine producers